Diplostichus is a genus of flies in the family Tachinidae.

Species
D. janitrix (Hartig, 1838)

References

Tachinidae genera
Exoristinae
Taxa named by Julius von Bergenstamm
Taxa named by Friedrich Moritz Brauer